Marching lines are a pair of lines drawn on the glass of a compass, and arranged at 45 degrees to each other. These are an essential component in hiking through the wilderness. Most modern compasses have adjustable luminous marching lines.

History

See also
 Azimuth
 Beam compass
 Circumferentor, or surveyor's compass
 Coordinate system
 Fluxgate compass
 Gyrocompass
 Inertial navigation system
 Pelorus
 Radio direction finder

References

External links

Navigational equipment
Hiking equipment
Orientation (geometry)